Ormudzia is a monotypic snout moth genus described by Hans Georg Amsel in 1954. Its only species, Ormudzia cameratella, described by the same author, is found in Iran.

References

Taxa named by Hans Georg Amsel
Phycitinae
Monotypic moth genera
Moths of Asia
Pyralidae genera